A marksmanship ribbon is a United States Navy, Air Force, Space Force, and Coast Guard award that is issued to its members who pass a weapons qualification course and achieve an above-average score.  Additionally, there are select state National Guard organizations that award marksmanship ribbons for high placement in state-level marksmanship competitions.

U.S. Navy

The U.S. Navy has issued these two marksmanship awards since 1920: the Navy Pistol Marksmanship Ribbon which is currently awarded for qualification on the Beretta M9 9mm pistol, and the Navy Rifle Marksmanship Ribbon which is currently awarded for qualification on the M4 variant.

The Navy issues the marksmanship ribbon in three levels of precedence: Expert, Sharpshooter, and  Marksman. The basic ribbon is awarded for the Marksman level while the specific ribbon device is awarded for qualification as a Sharpshooter or Expert. Those receiving an Expert qualification receive the Marksmanship Medal and Marksmanship Ribbon.

The Navy also issued Distinguished Marksmanship Ribbons between 1942 and 1960 which were declared obsolete by 1965.

U.S. Air Force and U.S. Space Force

The U.S. Air Force and U.S. Space Force awards a single ribbon, known as the Small Arms Expert Marksmanship Ribbon, for an expert qualification on either the M16 rifle, M4 carbine or the M9 or M17/18 pistol.  The ribbon is issued in only one degree; however, a  inch bronze star may be worn on the ribbon for those who have qualified expert on both the service rifle and pistol.  The ribbon was authorized by the Secretary of the Air Force on Aug. 28, 1962, and was awarded to all Air Force and Space Force members who qualified after Jan. 1, 1963. Prior to the conception of a ribbon, Air Force members were awarded with the United States Air Force Small Arms Marksmanship Certificate of Achievement (AF Form 1193 Jan 1961).

U.S. Coast Guard

The U.S. Coast Guard Marksmanship Ribbons are issued under the same criteria as the U.S. Navy, but Coast Guardsmen use a .40 cal SIG Sauer P229R DAK pistol instead of the Navy's M9 pistol. The Coast Guard issues two ribbons, known as the Coast Guard Pistol Marksmanship Ribbon and the Coast Guard Rifle Marksmanship Ribbon. The ribbon device is awarded for qualification at the higher levels of sharpshooter and expert. Like the Navy, for those who receive an expert qualification, the Marksmanship Medal is awarded instead of the Marksmanship Ribbon.

U.S. National Guard

Once a year, thousands of U.S. Army and Air National Guard shooters (champion marksmanship teams from each state) compete against each other at the Winston P. Wilson Rifle and Pistol Championships.  In the Missouri National Guard, the top twelve guardsmen selected to represent their state at the Winston P. Wilson matches are awarded the Governor's Twelve Ribbon which is worn on dress uniforms; any guardsman who earns the award more than once wear Hawthorn Cluster device(s) on top of the ribbon.  In addition, these guardsman are awarded the Governor's Twelve Tab for wear on the combat uniform.

Similarly, the Adjutant General of Missouri awards the Adjutant General's Twenty Ribbon to soldiers and airmen who qualify among the top twenty competitors at the Missouri State Combat Matches conducted each year; specifically the top eight combat rifle shooters, the top eight pistol shooters, the top two light machine gun teams, and the top two scout/sniper teams.  In addition to this ribbon, these guardsman are also awarded the Adjutant General's Twenty Combat Badge for wear on the combat uniform.

Guardsmen are authorized to wear these ribbons as a permanent decoration on service dress uniforms, to the left of federal awards, when operating under Title 32 (state control) status.  When federalized (Title 10), guardsman cannot wear these ribbons until they return to Title 32 status.

Additional Information
The U.S. Army and U.S. Marine Corps provide weapons qualification badges instead of a marksmanship ribbon. For the services that award the marksmanship ribbon, re-qualification is not necessary once a service member has obtained the award, and the ribbon may be worn throughout an individual's career.  In the Navy and Coast Guard, the marksmanship ribbon may be upgraded with a specific ribbon device if a higher qualification is achieved.

See also
Marksmanship Device
Marksmanship Medal
Marksmanship Badge (United States)
Awards and decorations of the United States military

References

Awards and decorations of the United States Air Force
Awards and decorations of the United States Navy
Awards and decorations of the United States Coast Guard
Awards and decorations of the United States Space Force
Awards established in 1920
Military ribbons of the United States
US Coast Guard ribbon symbolism